The 2010 OFC Champions League Final was played over two legs between the winner of Group A Waitakere United from New Zealand and the winner of Group B PRK Hekari United from Papua New Guinea in the 2009–10 OFC Champions League. PRK Hekari United were crowned champions after defeating Waitakere United 4–2 on aggregate, ending New Zealand's dominance in the tournament since its inception in 2007.

Road to the final

Waitakere United 

Throughout the opening round, Waitakere United had been in a two-horse race between themselves and fellow NZFC club Auckland City FC who had won the previous seasons Champions League. An early slip up against New Caledonian club AS Magenta saw the club slip to third in the group, however a strong performance in the return leg saw Waitakere win 4–1 at home and a 5–1 thrashing of Tahiti's AS Manu-Ura saw them draw level once more with Auckland City. The final game of the group drew them against their Auckland rivals away from home. A draw for Waitakere would see them progress to the final on goal difference, and the game finished 2–2, knocking favourites Auckland out of the competition.

PRK Hekari United
Like Waitakere United, Hekari started poorly in their group. A 3–3 draw against Tafea FC and a 2–1 loss at home to Lautoka F.C. saw them languishing at the bottom of the table. However their luck would change, defeating Tafea FC 4–0 in the return leg would see Hekari move back up the table and in contention to qualify for the final. Wins against Lautoka F.C. and a 4–1 thrashing of Solomon Islands team Marist FC would see Hekari progress through to the final, a point above Lautoka.

Match summaries

Leg 1

Leg 2 

|}

First Match

Second Match

Champion

References

External links
 Oceania Football Confederation
 Waitakere United

OFC Champions League finals